William Walden may refer to:

 William Walden (musician)
 William Walden (character), a character from the TV series Homeland

See also
William Walden Rubey, American geologist